Pocketful of Rye or pocket full of rye may refer to:

 A Pocket Full of Rye, a 1953 detective novel by Agatha Christie
 "A pocket full of rye", a lyric from the nursery rhyme, "Sing a Song of Sixpence"
 A Pocketful of Rye, a 1969 novel by A. J. Cronin